Annapurna South is a mountain in the Annapurna Himal range of the Himalayas located in Nepal, and the 101st-highest mountain in the world. It is the 5th highest peak of the Annapurna mountain range. The nearby mountain Hiunchuli is in fact an extension of Annapurna South.

First Ascent 
The first ascent was achieved in 1964 by a six-person team from the Kyoto University Alpine Club. The team had originally planned an ascent of Dhaulagiri IV but upon permit application to the Government of Nepal they were informed that permission had already been given to a British team. The expedition left the Pokhara airfield with a support team of four Sherpas, 54 porters and a liaison officer on September 9. They reached the valley containing the ablation zone of the South Annapurna Glacier on September 15 where they established base camp. On September 21 Camp I was setup at  upon the moraine of the Ganesh Glacier after a four-day reconnaissance. The next day the first assault team of three members reached the summit of the central peak in mid afternoon. However, the team now could see that the peaks to the north and south were slightly higher than the central peak which was thought to be the highest when viewed from base camp. With an estimated five hours to reach either peak though, it was too late to make the attempt so the team made the six-hour descent to Camp V. On October 15, two teams of two people made for the north and south peaks. The south peak team continued over the central peak and reached the south summit at noon time which they concluded to be the highest point. The second team headed to the north summit managed to reached a minor peak on the way but poor route conditions and lack of time prevented them from reaching the northernmost peak. Both parties returned to Camp V by 4 pm.

Gallery

See also
 Annapurna I Main
 Annapurna I East
 Annapurna I Central
 Hiunchuli
 Annapurna II
 Annapurna III
 Annapurna IV

References 

Mountains of the Gandaki Province
Seven-thousanders of the Himalayas